Samuel Simmons (1640–1687) was an English printer, best known as the first publisher of several works by John Milton.

External links

1640 births
1687 deaths
English printers